Filip Ude (born 3 June 1986) is a Croatian gymnast. On 9 August 2008 he qualified for the Olympic final of the men's pommel horse at the 2008 Summer Olympics by finishing third, and on 17 August he won a silver medal in the finals.

His other notable highlights prior to the 2008 Olympics include obtaining 15.825 points on the pommel horse as well as 15.050 points on the parallel bars at the 2007/2008 World Cup, as well as obtaining 15.400 points on the floor exercise at the 2007 World Championships.

References

External links
 
 
 

1986 births
Living people
Sportspeople from Čakovec
Croatian male artistic gymnasts
Olympic gymnasts of Croatia
Gymnasts at the 2008 Summer Olympics
Gymnasts at the 2012 Summer Olympics
Gymnasts at the 2016 Summer Olympics
Olympic silver medalists for Croatia
Olympic medalists in gymnastics
Medalists at the 2008 Summer Olympics
Medalists at the World Artistic Gymnastics Championships
Mediterranean Games silver medalists for Croatia
Competitors at the 2009 Mediterranean Games
Mediterranean Games medalists in gymnastics
European Games competitors for Croatia
Gymnasts at the 2019 European Games
21st-century Croatian people